Tradescantia ernestiana, commonly called Ernest's Spiderwort, is a species of plant in the dayflower family that is native mainly to the interior highlands of the United States with a distinct population in Alabama. The plant is also found in Arkansas, Mississippi, Missouri, and Oklahoma.

It is a perennial that produces purple or blue flowers in the spring on herbaceous stems.

References

Tradescantia
Flora of the Southeastern United States
Flora of the South-Central United States
Flora without expected TNC conservation status